The white-striped viper gecko (Hemidactylus albofasciatus) is a species of gecko endemic to India.

Distribution
The species is currently known from few localities in the Maharashtra state. The type locality is Dorle Village in Rajapur Taluka, Ratnagiri district, Maharashtra. Its distribution is poorly known, and it could be more widely spread.

References

albofasciatus
Endemic fauna of India
Reptiles of India
Reptiles described in 1963